Rabbi Shubert Spero (born September 23, 1923) is an American rabbi.

Early life
Spero was born in New York City. He studied at Yeshiva Torah Vodaas in Brooklyn, New York.  He received his B.S degree at City College of New York and attained an M.A and a PhD in philosophy at Western Reserve University. In 1947 he received smicha and in 1950 became rabbi of Young Israel of Cleveland, Ohio.

Career
Spero is currently the Irving Stone Professor of Jewish Thought at Bar Ilan University and Rabbi Emeritus of Young Israel of Cleveland, Ohio.

He has written extensively on the subjects of halakha, ethics, the Holocaust, Jewish philosophy and the thought of Rabbi Joseph B. Soloveitchik.

Personal life
In 1983 with his wife and family he made aliyah to Israel settling in Jerusalem.

Works
 God in All Seasons (1967)
 Morality, Halakha, and the Jewish tradition (1983)
 Holocaust and Return to Zion: a Study in The Jewish Philosophy of History (2000)
 Aspects of Rabbi Joseph Dov Soloveitchik's Philosophy of Judaism: An Analytic Approach (2009)
 New Perspectives in Theology of Judaism (August 2013)
”The Faith of a Jew.” 1949 Jewish Pocket Books.

References

 About the author http://www.ktav.com/product_info.php?products_id=2313

1923 births
Living people
American Orthodox rabbis
Modern Orthodox rabbis
Jewish philosophers
Philosophers of Judaism
American emigrants to Israel
City College of New York alumni
Academic staff of Bar-Ilan University
Rabbis from New York City
Religious leaders from Cleveland
Case Western Reserve University alumni
20th-century American rabbis